Masters swimming is a special class of competitive swimming for swimmers 25 years and older. Premasters is normally included as well, from 18 years old (Canada, United States and Australia) or 20 years old (Europe).

In Canada ten thousand swimmers in more than 250 clubs are organized within the Masters Swimming Canada organization. In the United States around sixty thousand masters swimmers are supported by U.S. Masters Swimming, in more than 1,500 masters swimming clubs or workout groups.

Rules
The rules and distances are nearly the same as for senior swimming. However, "breaststroke kicking movement is permitted for butterfly," and meet programs include mixed relay events (2 men / 2 women). The latter one is now copied by seniors.

Age categories
Individual swimmers compete within age groups of five years, determined by the swimmer's age on 31 December current year (in U.S. for meets held in non-metric pools, the age is determined as of the day of the competition). 
The age groups are: A:25–29 (years old), B:30–34, C:35–39, D:40–44; E:45–49; F:50–54, G:55–59; H:60–64, I:65–69, J:70–74; K:75–79; L:80–84, M:85–89, N:90–94, P:95–99, Q:100–104, R:105–109 and so on at 5-year increments as necessary. In 2014 Jaring Timmermann from Canada, at the age of 105, did set a world record as the oldest, but he died the same year.

For Masters relay events, the age groups are determined by the combined age of the team participants in 40 years increments. This allows swimmers of very different ages to compete together in a team, as long as each swimmer is Masters (at least 25 years old). Combined age: A:100–119 (years old), B:120–159, C:160–199, D:200–239, E:240–279, F:280–319, G:320–359 and so on if ever necessary.

Description
Masters swimming is a fast-growing leisure activity, particularly in North America and Australia but also in Europe. Most towns or cities now have masters clubs. Typically these are very friendly and welcome newcomers.  The minimum requirements to join a masters club vary widely, anywhere from the ability to swim one length of the pool to the ability to swim a kilometre without stopping. Club members will follow a set of different drills and swims each time typically covering anything from 1.5 km to 3.5 km per one-hour session. Each club will have lanes and so whilst the younger and faster swimmers who are competing nationally and regionally are at one end, the other lanes are for hobbyists who may have taken up swimming quite recently.

U.S. Masters Swimming is the governing body of masters swimming in the United States, sponsoring competition at all levels.  In addition, it sponsors programs for non-competitive "fitness" swimmers who train primarily for the health benefits that the activity offers to the aging athlete.
Masters Swimming Canada is the governing body of masters swimming in Canada, listing swim clubs, competitions and provincial master swim associations.

FINA World Masters Championships

FINA organizes the FINA World Masters Championships since 1986, but 2 editions were held in the pre-FINA era:

1978 – Toronto, CAN (non-FINA)
1984 – Christchurch, NZL (non-FINA)

Records
As in senior swimming, there are world records for masters swimming, but they can only be set in a sanctioned masters meet. Official list of Masters swimming records are available at the FINA website masters section.

See also
European Masters Swimming Championships
June Krauser, "Mother of Masters swimming"
Masters (athletics)
Swimming

References

External links 
Australia: Masters Swimming Australia

Canada: Masters Swimming Canada

France: Fédération Française de Natation

Germany: Deutscher Schwimm-Verband

Great Britain: Amateur Swimming Association

International: FINA or Fédération internationale de natation (English: International Swimming Federation)

Japan: Japan Masters Swimming Association

United States of America: US Masters Swimming

 
Swimming
swimming